Die Neue Zeit (German: "The New Times") was a German socialist theoretical journal of the Social Democratic Party of Germany (SPD) that was published from 1883 to 1923. Its headquarters was in Stuttgart, Germany.

History and profile
Founded by leading socialist politicians and theorists, the magazine's first edition was released on 1 January 1883. After the abolition of the Anti-Socialist Laws, the magazine was transformed from a monthly into a weekly on 1 October 1890. In 1901 it became the official magazine of the SPD and its property. The magazine's decline and end came with the hyperinflation of the 1920s.  It became the most important organ of the SPD, competing with Sozialistische Monatshefte. It was edited by Karl Kautsky and Emanuel Wurm until their withdrawal from the SPD in 1917. Following that, Heinrich Cunow took over as its chief editor.

Austrian socialist theoretical journal, Der Kampf, was inspired from Die Neue Zeit.

Notable contributors
 Eduard Bernstein
 Wilhelm Blos
 Heinrich Cunow
 Friedrich Engels
 Paul Ernst
 Konrad Haenisch
 Rudolf Hilferding
 Karl Kautsky
 Karl Korn
 Gustav Landauer
 Paul Lensch
 Wilhelm Liebknecht
 Rosa Luxemburg
 Karl Marx
 Franz Mehring
 Anton Pannekoek
 Alexander Parvus
 Georgi Plekhanov
 Christian Rakovsky
 Friedrich Schrader
 Leon Trotsky, through Kautsky
 Julie Zadek

References

External links

 Die Neue Zeit Online in the digital library (Digitalen Bibliothek) of the Friedrich-Ebert-Stiftung (Friedrich Ebert Foundation)
 Die Neue Zeit in English
 An issue of Die Neue Zeit from 1893
 Volumes at archive.org: 1890: 8 * 1894: 12 * 1898: 16 * 1908: 26  * 1922: 40 

1883 establishments in Germany
1923 disestablishments in Germany
Defunct political magazines published in Germany
German-language magazines
Weekly magazines published in Germany
Magazines established in 1883
Magazines disestablished in 1923
Magazines published in Stuttgart
Socialist magazines
Social Democratic Party of Germany
Karl Kautsky